is a former Japanese football player.

Club statistics

References

External links

1988 births
Living people
Association football people from Nagano Prefecture
Japanese footballers
J1 League players
J2 League players
Vissel Kobe players
Thespakusatsu Gunma players
Association football defenders